Kalanchoe 'Tarantula', or ''Kalanchoe katapifa'' 'Tarantula', is a succulent cultivar in the kalanchoe genus that produces small bouquets of pink flowers.

Description

30cm in height and width, the plant features irregular, spidery leaves (hence its name), and produces long-lasting, vibrant pink flowers in spring and autumn.

Cultivation
It is cultivated as houseplant and as a rock or garden plant. In winter, it thrives in bright light indoors as it is frost-intolerant. In summer it would need bright indirect light with some shade.

See also
Kalanchoe blossfeldiana

References

Kalanchoe
House plants
Ornamental plant cultivars
Hybrid plants
Drought-tolerant plants